Karl Berg (12 January 1921 – 25 September 2007) was a German footballer who played internationally for Saarland.

References

1921 births
2007 deaths
Association football midfielders
Saar footballers
Saarland international footballers
1. FC Saarbrücken players